The 2020 Club Deportivo Universidad Católica season is the 80th season and the club's 46st consecutive season in the top flight of Chilean football. In addition to the domestic league, Universidad Católica are participating in this season's editions of the Supercopa de Chile, the Copa Libertadores and the Copa Sudamericana

Squad

Transfers

In

Out

Loans in

Loans out

New contracts

Competitions

Overview

Primera Division

League table

Results summary

Results by round

Matches

Supercopa de Chile

Copa Libertadores

Group stage

The group stage draw was held on 17 December 2019, 20:30 PYST (UTC−3), at the CONMEBOL Convention Centre in Luque, Paraguay.

Copa Sudamericana

Second stage

Knockout phase

Round of 16

Quarter-finals

Statistics

Squad statistics

† Player left Universidad Católica during the season

Goals

Last updated: December 2020
Source: Soccerway

Assists

Last updated: December 2020
Source: Soccerway

Clean sheets

Last updated: December 2020 
Source: Soccerway

Notes

References

External links

2020